Fabio Caressa (born 18 April 1967) is an Italian journalist and football commentator, broadcasting for Sky Italia.

Career 
Caressa began his career in 1986 for Canale 66, a local Roman broadcaster linked to TeleRoma56. In 1991 he was chosen to take part in the commentators team for the newly founded Italian pay tv TELE+, founded by Groupe Canal+. In 1998, he started commenting on Sunday evening Serie A matches, taking turns with Massimo Marianella. In 2002, Caressa became the main voice of Sky Sport and, together with former Inter Milan defender Giuseppe Bergomi, he became one of the most celebrated sporting commentators in Italy.

After the 2006 FIFA World Cup, which Italy won, Caressa wrote a book about his experiences during his career and the World cup, called Andiamo a Berlino ("We're going to Berlin"), a reference to Caressa's exclamation at the end of Italy's World Cup semi-final victory against hosts Germany, which ended in a 2–0 victory after extra time; just a few seconds after Italy's second goal, scored by Alessandro Del Piero, Caressa shouted the phrase, expressing his joy for Italy's qualification for the final that would be played in Berlin.

Caressa commentated all swimming events in Sky Sport's coverage of the 2012 Summer Olympics for the first time in his career, along with former swimmers Massimiliano Rosolino and Cristina Chiuso.

From 1 July 2013 to 10 March 2016, Caressa was Sky Sport's ad interim co-director, with delegation to Sky Sport 24, then becoming Sky Sport director. In December 2016, he was appointed Sky Sport co-director with delegation to the program Sky Calcio Club.

Personal life 
Caressa is married to Italian TV-news journalist Benedetta Parodi. Together, they have two daughters and one son: Matilde (born 28 September 2002), Eleonora (born 20 October 2004) and Diego (born 28 October 2009).

References 

1967 births
Living people
Writers from Rome
Italian male journalists
Italian sports journalists
Italian sports commentators
Association football commentators
Libera Università Internazionale degli Studi Sociali Guido Carli alumni